Photopea is a web-based photo and graphics editor. It is used for image editing, making illustrations, web design or converting between different image formats. Photopea is advertising-supported software. It is compatible with all modern web browsers, including Opera, Edge, Chrome, and Firefox. The app is compatible with raster and vector graphics, such as Photoshop’s PSD as well as JPEG, PNG, DNG, GIF, SVG, PDF and other image file formats. While browser-based, Photopea stores all files locally, and does not upload any data to a server.

Photopea is often considered a free alternative to Adobe Photoshop with fewer features. This makes the web-app a consideration for a lot of Info. Tech/Business Studies teachers, as they are able to let the students work from home without having to pay for Adobe Photoshop.

Features 
Photopea has various image editing tools including spot healing, a clone stamp healing brush, and a patch tool. The software supports layers, layer masks, channels, selections, paths, smart objects, layer styles, text layers, filters and vector shapes.

Reception 
Photopea has received positive coverage due to its similarities to Adobe Photoshop in design and workflow, making it an easier program for those trained in Photoshop to use, compared to other free raster image editors such as GIMP.

See also
 Comparison of raster graphics editors
 Pixlr

References

External links 

 Official website
 Photopea Blog

Adware
Cross-platform software
Photo software
Web applications
2013 software
Graphics software
Proprietary cross-platform software
Raster graphics editors
Vector graphics editors